A Distinguished Career Award is an award recognizing individuals for notable contributions to their fields, companies, or organizations.  Distinguished Career Awards are typically bestowed on recipients later in their careers, as opposed to Early Career Awards, which recognize contributions towards the beginning of an individual's career.

See also
American Public Health Association Awards (Distinguished Career Award)
American Sociological Association Awards 
Awards and decorations of the United States government
Distinguished Career Intelligence Medal

References

External links
ASHE Distinguished Career Award
ASPHO Distinguished Career Award
Distinguished Career Award for the Practice of Sociology
Euorgraphics Distinguished Career Award
GSA Quaternary Geology & Geomorphology Division Distinguished Career Award
International Neuropsychological Society Awards
NOAA Distinguished Career Awards
SCMS Distinguished Career Achievement Award

Career awards